Papillary serous cystadenocarcinomas are the most common form of malignant ovarian cancer making up 26 percent of ovarian tumours in women aged over 20 in the United States.

As with most ovarian tumours, due to the lack of early signs of disease these tumours can be large when discovered and have often metastasized, often by spreading along the peritoneum.

Histopathology
Papillary serous cystadenocarcinomas may exhibit psammoma bodies upon histopathology.

Diagnosis

Epidemiology

Gallery

References

External links 

Gynaecological cancer